Paul Cornick (born March 15, 1989) is an American football offensive tackle who is currently a free agent. He played college football at North Dakota State University and attended Orono High School in Orono, Minnesota. He has been a member of the New York Jets, Denver Broncos and Chicago Bears of the National Football League (NFL).

Early years
Cornick participated in football and track and field for Orono High School. He was an Associated Press honorable mention all-state selection in 2006 and a Star Tribune third-team all-metro team selection. He has one older sister, Jennifer Campbell.

College career
Cornick played for the North Dakota State Bison from 2008 to 2011. He was redshirted in 2007.

Professional career

New York Jets
Cornick signed with the New York Jets on July 12, 2012 after going undrafted in the 2012 NFL Draft. He was released by the Jets on August 31, 2012.

Denver Broncos
Cornick was signed to the Denver Broncos' practice squad on December 10, 2012. He was released by the Broncos on August 31, 2013. He was signed the Broncos' practice squad on September 4, 2013. Cornick was signed to a futures deal by the Broncos on February 4, 2014. He made his NFL debut on September 7, 2014 against the Indianapolis Colts. He was released by the Broncos on May 4, 2015.

Chicago Bears
Cornick was claimed off waivers by the Chicago Bears on May 5, 2015. He was waived just two days later on May 7, 2015 due to a failed physical.

References

External links
NFL Draft Scout
Denver Broncos bio

1989 births
Living people
People from Maple Plain, Minnesota
Players of American football from Minnesota
Sportspeople from the Minneapolis–Saint Paul metropolitan area
American football offensive tackles
North Dakota State Bison football players
New York Jets players
Denver Broncos players
Chicago Bears players